The Fire is a 2015 Argentine drama film directed by Juan Schnitman. It was screened in the Panorama section of the 65th Berlin International Film Festival. The film won the top prize at the 2015 Transilvania International Film Festival.

Plot 
Lucía and Marcelo are about to buy a condominium. The date of the purchase or the handing over of the keys is delayed by one day and thus offers the opportunity to reconsider the drastic decision that will determine their future for a long time. The story is told in a close-up of the course of this day, in which communication patterns, professional and health problems, hopes and wishes come to light. The situation escalates both verbally and physically.

Cast
 Pilar Gamboa as Lucía
 Juan Barberini as Marcelo

References

External links
 

2015 films
2015 drama films
Argentine drama films
2010s Spanish-language films
2010s Argentine films